Interstate 185 may refer to:
 Interstate 185 (Georgia), a spur to Columbus, Georgia
 Interstate 185 (South Carolina), a spur in Greenville, South Carolina

85-1
1